Phyllomacromia monoceros is a species of dragonfly in the family Corduliidae. It is found in the Democratic Republic of the Congo, Kenya, Malawi, Mozambique, Somalia, South Africa, Tanzania, Uganda, Zambia, Zimbabwe, possibly Burundi, and possibly Sierra Leone. Its natural habitats are subtropical or tropical moist lowland forests, subtropical or tropical dry shrubland, subtropical or tropical moist shrubland, subtropical or tropical high-altitude shrubland, and rivers.

References

Corduliidae
Taxonomy articles created by Polbot